White River is a town in Ashland County, Wisconsin, United States. The population was 921 at the 2010 census. The census-designated place of Marengo and unincorporated communities of Sanborn and part of Jolmaville are located in the town.

Geography

Demographics
As of the census of 2000, there were 892 people, 281 households, and 207 families residing in the town. The population density was 20.3 people per square mile (7.8/km2). There were 312 housing units at an average density of 7.1 per square mile (2.7/km2). The racial makeup of the town was 96.97% White, 1.91% Native American, 0.22% Asian, 0.34% from other races, and 0.56% from two or more races. Hispanic or Latino of any race were 0.56% of the population.

There were 281 households, out of which 39.5% had children under the age of 18 living with them, 64.1% were married couples living together, 5.7% had a female householder with no husband present, and 26.3% were non-families. 21.4% of all households were made up of individuals, and 9.3% had someone living alone who was 65 years of age or older. The average household size was 3.17 and the average family size was 3.84.

In the town, the population was spread out, with 40.2% under the age of 18, 8.0% from 18 to 24, 26.2% from 25 to 44, 16.7% from 45 to 64, and 8.9% who were 65 years of age or older. The median age was 27 years. For every 100 females, there were 100.4 males. For every 100 females age 18 and over, there were 98.9 males.

The median income for a household in the town was $38,250, and the median income for a family was $41,765. Males had a median income of $30,875 versus $19,688 for females. The per capita income for the town was $15,667. About 3.4% of families and 5.6% of the population were below the poverty line, including 6.3% of those under age 18 and 3.3% of those age 65 or over.

References

Towns in Ashland County, Wisconsin
Towns in Wisconsin